Sandra Cecchini and Patricia Tarabini were the defending champions but only Cecchini competed that year with Laura Garrone.

Cecchini and Garrone lost in the quarterfinals to Virag Csurgo and Flora Perfetti.

Silvia Farina and Andrea Temesvári won in the final 6–2, 6–2 against Alexandra Fusai and Wiltrud Probst.

Seeds
Champion seeds are indicated in bold text while text in italics indicates the round in which those seeds were eliminated.

 Alexandra Fusai /  Wiltrud Probst (final)
 Silvia Farina /  Andrea Temesvári (champions)
 Petra Schwarz /  Katarína Studeníková (semifinals)
 Sandra Cecchini /  Laura Garrone (quarterfinals)

Draw

External links
 1995 Styrian Open Doubles Draw

WTA Austrian Open
1995 WTA Tour